José Luis de Vilallonga y Cabeza de Vaca, 9th Marquess of Castellbell, GE (29 January 1920 – 30 August 2007) was a Spanish nobleman, author, socialite and film actor. His peculiar character, described as "a mixture of aristocratic arrogance, self-confidence and unconcern", brought him frequent enmities with other public figures. He was known to be a multifaceted, charming, elegant and playboy-like figure. At his death in 2007, Vilallonga was referred to by several newspapers as "the last dandy".

Family 
Villalonga was born to an important Catalan noble family, son of Salvador de Vilallonga y Cárcer, 8th Marquess of Castellbell amongst other titles, and María del Carmen Cabeza de Vaca y Carvajal, daughter of the 9th Marquess of Portago. On his paternal side, he was descended from viceroy Amat, whereas on his maternal side, some of Vilallonga's ancestors were Alvar Núñez Cabeza de Vaca, Pedro Téllez-Girón, Ferrante Gonzaga II and Christopher Columbus. Both Alfonso de Portago and Vicente Sartorius were his first cousins, being all from the maternal side of the Cabeza de Vaca family.

Biography

Early life and Spanish Civil War 
Born in Madrid, Vilallonga – who also went by the surname of Cabeza de Vaca –  was a Grandee of Spain and part of the nobility, holding the title of Marquess of Castellbell. 

He spent the first two years of his life at a clinic in Munich, to recover from an intestinal condition with which he was born. His grandmother had a powerful influence on his education, which was very broad and advanced for the time. He studied at the Jesuits of Barcelona and in other schools from which he was often expelled for misbehavior.

Upon the declaration in 1931 of Spain's Second Republic his family went into exile in Biarritz, France, but returned six months later. When the Spanish Civil War erupted in 1936, Vilallonga was studying at École Saint-Elme, a Dominican school in Arcachon, but his father ordered him back to Spain to fight on the side of the Nationalists. His father was an enthusiastic supporter of the rebel side, and at age 16 the younger Vilallonga was a serving member of a Nationalist execution platoon, as a provisional second lieutenant of Requetés.

Diplomat and author 
After pursuing a four-year long career in diplomacy, he married his first wife Esyylt Priscilla "Pip" Scott-Ellis, a daughter of Thomas Scott-Ellis, 8th Baron Howard de Walden, while he was working as an attaché in London. They met in January 1944 and they married at Sanlúcar on 20 September 1945. Her family did not approve and none of them could attend the wedding. His father-in-law was so unimpressed by him that he had his will changed in the faint hope of protecting his daughter's inheritance. He then became interested in journalism and literature, his first works being at Diario de Barcelona. After World War II, de Vilallonga became increasingly disenchanted with Francoist Spain, and he left the Spanish diplomatic service to live abroad.

In 1954 his first novel, The Ramblas End in the Sea, was published, causing the Spanish military government censor to issue a ban on his reentry to the country. He then obtained work as a foreign correspondent for the national press agency EFE and for the magazines Paris Match, Marie Claire and Vogue.  His social connections and ability to relate gossip among Europe's jet set enabled him to regularly sell magazine articles, in addition to authoring four autobiographical tell-all books about his numerous love affairs.  After recording taped interviews with Spain's King Juan Carlos, he wrote the first ever and only authorised biography of king Juan Carlos I, titled El Rey and published in 1993.

He had a brief step through politics, that included toying with the Socialist Party of Spain.

Actor 
Vilallonga's acting career came through as a result of his good connections with many prominent figures of the artistic world. He made his film debut in the 1958 Louis Malle film The Lovers. Throughout the late 1950s and 1960s, Vilallonga appeared in numerous films in both Europe and Hollywood, working with prominent directors like Federico Fellini, Agnès Varda, Fred Zinnemann and John Schlesinger.

Though he refused a Hollywood acting contract, a highlight in his acting career was a role as "José da Silva Pereira," the dashing Brazilian multimillionaire whom Holly Golightly (played by Audrey Hepburn) planned to marry in Blake Edwards' classic movie, Breakfast at Tiffany's (1961). He also appeared as the debonair Prince Cesare della Romita, who becomes Julie Christie's second husband in Darling (1965).

Personal life
Vilallonga was married three times: 

 The Honourable Esyllt-Priscilla Scott-Ellis (b. 1916 d. 1983) (married 1945, divorced 1972)
 Syliane Stella Morell (married 1974, divorced 1995)
 Begoña Aranguren (married 1999, separated 2002)

A spendthrift, he soon disposed of much of his first wife's inheritance and property. He had frequent affairs, including a relationship with the French actress Michèle Girardon and Hungarian actress Magda Gabor, both while still married to Essylt-Priscilla Scott-Ellis. They lived in France and Argetina and they had two children before they divorced in 1972. Girardon eventually committed suicide in 1975 after de Vilallonga ended their relationship to marry Syliane Stella Morell. Though courts twice found him liable for alimony to his first wife Essylt-Priscilla Scott-Ellis, de Vilallonga never paid the judgment, an act which reduced her to poverty for the remainder of her life. His third wife Begoña Aranguren also became disenchanted with de Vilallonga, and the couple separated in 2002. Aranguren wrote a scathing portrayal of the aging socialite and their marriage in 2004.

Death
De Vilallonga died at his home on the island of Mallorca on 30 August 2007 from natural causes. He is survived by children John and Carmen from his first marriage and an adopted son Fabricio. King Juan Carlos expressed his sadness at Vilallonga's death.

Filmography

Bibliography 
 The Man of Blood (1961), 
 Allegro Barbaro (1969), 
 The King (1994), 
 Fiesta (1995), 
 Solo, Editions (2000),

References

External links 
 
 Obituary in The Times
 

1920 births
2007 deaths
Male actors from Madrid
Spanish male film actors
Spanish male writers
Margraves of Castellbell
Spanish writers in French
Spanish diplomats
Deaths in Spain
Spanish military personnel of the Spanish Civil War (National faction)
Spanish socialists
Francoist Spain
People of the Spanish Civil War
Spanish expatriates in France